Moran Cerf is am American-French-Israeli neuroscientist, professor of business (at the Kellogg School of Management at Northwestern University), investor and former white hat hacker.

He is the founder of Think-Alike and B-Cube and the host and curator of PopTech, one of the top 5 leading conferences in the world. Cerf is also the president and co-founder of the Human Single Neuron society. As of 2013, he is a member of the Northwestern Institute on Complex Systems.

Cerf has received numerous awards including the Templeton Foundation "Extraordinary Minds" award, and the Chicagoan award. Recently, he was named one of the "40 Leading Professors Below 40". He has won several national storytelling competitions, most notably the Moth Grandslam, multiple times.

Cerf is the Alfred P. Sloan screenwriting professor at the American Film Institute (AFI) where he teaches an annual workshop on science in films. He is also a science consultant to Hollywood films and TV series (Limitless, Bull, Falling Water, etc.).

He has spoken publicly on topics of neuroscience, business, decision making and hacking (TED, PopTech, Google, TEDx, TED-Ed) and his views on the risks of hacking into humans' brains often appear in the media.

Early life and background
Cerf was born in Paris, France, to a Jewish family, and raised in Israel. As a young child he was an art prodigy, attending the Israeli School of Arts. He appeared in many Israeli TV shows for children when young, which garnered him attention in Israel. In 2002, he had one of the first podcasts in the world, where he hosted a weekly radio show.

As a young child, Cerf became an avid programmer and was part of a small community of hackers that paved the road to online white hat hacking.

Education
Cerf holds a Bachelor of Science in Physics (1998–2000), and a Master's Degree in Philosophy (2000) from Tel Aviv University.

In 2002, he received the prestigious Presidential Scholarship award in Israel while originally pursuing a PhD in philosophy. In 2005 he shifted to neuroscience, and ultimately completed a PhD in neuroscience at Caltech (2009).

While pursuing his studies, Cerf worked as a white hat hacker in the emerging Israeli  cybersecurity industry, performing penetration tests for banks and government institutes. He attributes much of his understanding of the brain and the way he researches to his time spent breaking codes and performing penetration tests. A single meeting with the late Francis Crick where the two discussed the importance of "using hacking skills to study the most interesting vault in the world – our brain" made Prof. Cerf leave his senior business post and pursue full-time PhD at Caltech, under Prof. Christof Koch. 

Cerf completed his PhD at Caltech during 2005–2009 and worked on one of the flagship projects in neuroscience: "Single Neuron Recording in Humans". This project involves studying humans using direct recordings from their brain while they are awake with electrodes implanted inside their heads. This unique research setup gained him worldwide recognition and resulted in some of the widely cited publications that positioned Cerf at the forefront of neuroscience research.

Following his time at Caltech Professor Cerf moved to NYU, where he spent three years studying what makes content engaging and looking for ways to translate his neuroscience research to a broader audience. It is the time there that he attributes to his interest in finding ways to understand how to translate brain research to applications and the need to work together with the business world to communicate science.

Following his time at NYU studying engagement, and with the growth of public attention to his work (in part due to his repeated wins of the Moth Grandslam story-telling competition, where he discussed the behind the scenes of neuroscience), Prof. Cerf became a public figure in the science communication sphere where his talks garnered a large following.

In 2014 Cerf was appointed as a professor at the Kellogg School of Management, where he holds positions as both a business and neuroscience professor.

In 2016 he joined the MIT Media Lab as a visiting professor, where he started his work on dream recording and manipulation.

Notable research
Cerf is well known for his research on consciousness and projecting people's thoughts and dreams directly from their brain, his research on free will, his ideas on the future of humans and the ability to hack our brains, and for his work in the neuroscience in marketing. Applications include predicting people's interest and engagement with content by observing their neural responses. For this work, he was named by Prof. Phil Kotler (father of modern marketing) "the next leader in marketing". He is a frequent contributor to "Business Insider", "Forbes" and various other popular media journals where he writes on topics in neuroscience and business and ways to implement science in decision-making.

In his 2016 TED talk, Cerf discussed a method for extraction of dreams which he was rumored to turn into a company, Dream-Alike. Similar mention of his work on projecting thoughts was later discussed in a blog post at ‘Wait But Why’.

Career
Prior to his academic career, Cerf held positions in pharmaceutical, telecommunications, fashion, software development, and innovative research fields.

Hacking
Cerf spent nearly a decade working as a computer system hacker, breaking into financial and government institutes to test and improve their security.

As a hacker, Cerf was first working for Check Point, and later started his own for-hire ‘white hat’ hackers team that helped business secure their systems from malevolent hackers. His team later integrated into the ADC (Advanced Defense Center) at a then-startup company called Imperva (now a NASDAQ traded company) where Cerf ran the ADC and spent a number of years before leaving for academia, holding various managerial positions.

Some of Cerf's stories about hacking and his experiences as a hacker were included in various films and became the basis for his worldwide acclaim.

Neuroscience
In an interview with Forbes, Professor Cerf attributed his success as a neuroscientist to his hacking background, saying the non-traditional tools he uses to investigate the brain and his creative way of thinking about black boxes borrows from his time breaking codes. Cerf is known for his pioneering work studying patients undergoing brain-surgery, which allows him to investigate behavior, emotion, decision making, and dreams by directly recording the activity of individual neurons using electrodes implanted in the patient's brain.

As a business professor, Cerf's work focuses on drivers of decision-making in consumer neuroscience, and using neuro-marketing techniques to gain insights about consumer behavior. He is an associate editor for several scholarly journals in both business and neuroscience and a consultant for companies in many industries, including automotive (Ferrari), performance (Red Bull), finance (TransUnion), and  relationships (Tinder).

Hollywood
Since 2007, Cerf has held a permanent appointment at the American Film Institute (AFI) as the Alfred P. Sloan Professor, where he teaches an annual workshop on science communication in film and TV. Through this workshop he has worked on various films and TV shows. He also organizes the annual Sloan seminar, where he has held public discussions on science communication with Hollywood figures like Ann Druyan (Cosmos), Michelle Ashford (Masters of Sex), Whitney Cummings (Whitney, 2 Broke Girls), Giancarlo Esposito (Breaking Bad), Jake Gyllenhaal (Donnie Darko), Len Mlodinow (ghost writer of Stephen Hawking's books and writer on MacGyver), Andy Serkis (King Kong, Gollum in Lord of the Rings), Michael Begler and Jack Amiel (The Knick), Clifford Johnson (theoretical physicist) and more.

Books
 Competition and Attention in the Human Brain: Single neuron recordings and eye-tracking in healthy controls and subjects with neurological and psychiatric disorders, Lap Lambert Academic Publishing, 2012, 
 Single Neuron Studies of the Human Brain: Probing Cognition, co-authored with Itzhak Fried and Ueli Rutishauser and Gabriel Kreiman, The MIT Press, 2014, 
 Consumer Neuroscience, MIT Press, 2017, 
 Foresight, Northwestern University, 2017,

Awards and recognition
 2016: 40 Leading Professors Below 40
 2010, 2016: 2 times US champion of the Moth Grand-Slam

Filmography

Philanthropy
In 2018, Cerf founded B-Cube, a non-profit that helps organizations use advances in neuroscience to change behavior. While B-Cube's endeavors are not public, it is estimated that they invested shy of $12M in 2018 in their projects. B-Cube has worked with Ferrari (on improving risk assessment in driving), with SS&C (on ways to improve learning in classrooms), with Viacom (on applications of neuroscience to entertainment) and with Founders Pledge (on using neuroscience for social good).

As Cerf is the host and curator of PopTech and responsible for their fellows program, B-Cube may also be involved in the PopTech mission for social good promotion through technology.

Cerf has spoken at the UN and various organizations on ways to use neuroscience and research to promote young individuals’ rise out of poverty, on the ethics of using neuroscience to prevent threats to democracy and on the dangers of the attention economy.

Government
Cerf worked with the United States Digital Service (USDS) under President Obama, and continued working with 18F during the Trump administration. His work focused on cybersecurity, in particular the ‘login.gov’ project.

Personal life
In 2017, Cerf dated actress Ashley Judd. They were last seen together at the Sundance Film Festival. In 2011–2012 Cerf dated actress Kristina Anapau (True Blood). In 2016, Cerf was selected as one of Elle Magazine’s most eligible bachelors.

In his free time, Cerf is a pilot (Private Jets and Helicopters).

Board and other posts
 Board member, Chicago Ideas
 Host and curator, PopTech
 Co-founder, Human Intracranial Research Foundation
 Board member, VR Americas
 Co-Founder, ThinkAlike
 Founder (rumored), DreamAlike
 Presidential Innovation Fellow, White House USDS/18F
 Founder, B-Cube

See also
 List of neuroscientists
 List of hackers
 David Eagleman
 Dan Ariely
 Bryan Johnson (entrepreneur)
 Elon Musk

References

External links
 Moran Cerf's official website
 Moran Cerf, Le "Hacker" Du Cerveau
 Moran Cerf at TED (conference)
 B-Cube

California Institute of Technology alumni
Tel Aviv University alumni
Living people
21st-century American short story writers
Scientists from New York City
Writers from New York City
Year of birth missing (living people)
French emigrants to Israel
Israeli Jews
Israeli neuroscientists
Israeli science writers
Israeli scientists